Benjamin Ellingham Johns (born March 18, 1999) is an American professional pickleball player. He is ranked No. 1 in the world for doubles, mixed doubles, and singles by the Pro Pickleball Association (PPA) as well as by the World Pickleball Rankings and Global Pickleball Rankings.

Personal life
Johns was raised in Laytonsville, Maryland. He was homeschooled as a child and currently studies Materials Science and Engineering at the University of Maryland, College Park’s School of Engineering. He is the middle child of 7 children, including his elder brother Collin Johns, who is another highly-ranked professional pickleball player and Johns’ set doubles partner.

Pickleball career
Johns played tennis and table tennis since he was a child, showing some proficiency in both sports and helping his older brother Collin Johns train for the pro tennis circuit. He first played pickleball in 2016 at the age of 17 while vacationing in Florida and took fifth place in Men’s Pro Singles at the U.S. Open Pickleball Championships just a few months later. He began to play in tournaments consistently and earned his first gold medal at the Riverbend RV Resort Pickleball Tournament a little less than a year later. That same year, he returned to the U.S Open and took gold in Men’s Pro Singles. Shortly thereafter, he won three gold medals at the Canadian Nationals, bringing him to the forefront of the sport.  He has won more than 50 gold medals in his professional career, 11 of which were triple crowns (gold medals in all three events). In 2019, he became the first male professional player to win a triple crown at one of the world’s three major pickleball events when he captured it at the Tournament of Champions in Brigham City, Utah. He followed up this achievement in 2021 by winning the triple crown at the US Open, one of the sport’s most difficult feats. Two of his statistics that most exemplify his dominance are his undefeated runs in men’s singles and mixed doubles since July 2019 and August 2019, respectively. Johns has partnered with Anna Leigh Waters in mixed doubles. 

In 2019, he signed a sponsorship deal with Franklin Sports which lasted for 3 years. 

On April 1, 2022 he signed a new partnership collaboration with JOOLA Pickleball, a global sporting goods company based in Rockville, MD, near where he grew up and played table tennis in his youth. He collaborated with JOOLA to design and produce his new official paddle, the JOOLA Ben Johns Hyperion CFS 16.

Business endeavors
In 2019, Ben Johns, along with fellow professional pickleball player Dekel Bar, launched Pickleball Getaways, a company that combines vacations to exotic destinations with pickleball instruction on-site. Johns and Bar have already led trips to the Mayan Riviera, Ecuador, Dominican Republic, Richmond BC, and many other locations.

In 2021, Ben Johns, along with his brother Collin Johns and Dekel Bar, released an instructional video subscription service titled Pickleball 360. The service has a monthly and yearly subscription that grants access to instructional videos from the aforementioned professional players.

In 2021, Ben Johns launched elog.com, a website for investing in a cryptocurrency index fund.

In addition to his businesses and pro career, Johns also launched The Freestyle Boys podcast in 2021 with fellow pro and friend, Rob Nunnery. On the show, Johns and Nunnery discuss the latest pickleball news and happenings, tournament schedules, pickleball info and tips, food, travel, and personal life.

Television appearances
On October 8, 2021, Ben Johns appeared on the Live with Kelly And Ryan show alongside his brother Collin Johns, in a match setup outside of the show's New York City studio.

References

1999 births
American sportsmen
Living people
Pickleball players
Sportspeople from Montgomery County, Maryland
University of Maryland, College Park alumni